Khakas (also known as Xakas, endonym: хакас тілі, xakas tëlë, тадар тілі, tadar tëlë) is a Turkic language spoken by the Khakas people, who mainly live in the southwestern Siberian Khakas Republic, in Russia. The Khakas number 73,000, of whom 42,000 speak the Khakas language. Most Khakas speakers are bilingual in Russian.

In fact, these names represent former administrative units rather than tribal or linguistic groups. The people speaking all these dialects simply referred to themselves as Tadar (i.e. Tatar).

History and documentation 
The people who speak the Fuyu Kyrgyz language originated in the Yenisei region of Siberia but were relocated into the Dzungar Khanate by the Dzungars, and then the Qing moved them from Dzungaria to northeastern China in 1761, and the name may be due to the survival of a common tribal name. The Yenisei Kirghiz were made to pay tribute in a treaty concluded between the Dzungars and Russians in 1635. Sibe Bannermen were stationed in Dzungaria while Northeastern China (Manchuria) was where some of the remaining Öelet Oirats were deported to. The Nonni basin was where Oirat Öelet deportees were settled. The Yenisei Kirghiz were deported along with the Öelet. Chinese and Oirat replaced Oirat and Kirghiz during Manchukuo as the dual languages of the Nonni-based Yenisei Kirghiz. The present-day Kyrgyz people originally lived in the same area that the speakers of Fuyu Kyrgyz at first dwelled within modern-day Russia. These Kyrgyz were known as the Yenisei Kyrgyz. It is now spoken in northeastern China's Heilongjiang province, in and around Fuyu County, Qiqihar (300 km northwest of Harbin) by a small number of passive speakers who are classified as Kyrgyz nationality.

The first major recordings of the Khakas language originate from the middle of the 19th century. The Finnish linguist Matthias Castrén, who travelled through northern and Central Asia between 1845 and 1849, wrote a treatise on the Koybal dialect, and recorded an epic. Wilhelm Radloff traveled the southern Siberian region extensively between 1859 and 1870. The result of his research was, among others, published in his four-volume dictionary, and in his ten-volume series of Turkic texts. The second volume contains his Khakas materials, which were provided with a German translation. The ninth volume, provided with a Russian translation, was prepared by Radloff's student Katanov, who was a Sagay himself, and contains further Khakas materials.

The Khakas literary language, which was developed only after the Russian Revolution of 1917, is based on the central dialects Sagay and Kacha; the Beltir dialect has largely been assimilated by Sagay, and the Koybal dialect by Kacha.

In 1924, a Cyrillic alphabet was devised, which was replaced by a Latin alphabet in 1929, and by a new Cyrillic alphabet in 1939.

In 2012, an Enduring Voices expedition documented the Xyzyl language from the Republic of Khakassia. Officially considered a dialect of Khakas, its speakers regard Xyzyl as a separate language of its own.

Classification
The Khakas language is part of the South Siberian subgroup of Turkic languages, along with Shor, Chulym, Tuvan, Tofa, and Northern Altai. The language of the Turkic-speaking Yugurs of Gansu and the Fuyu Kyrgyz language of a small group of people in Manchuria also share some similarities with languages of this subgroup. The Khakas language has also been part of a wider language area covering the Southern Samoyedic languages Kamassian and Mator. A distinctive feature that these languages share with Khakas and Shor is a process of nasal assimilation, whereby a word-initial palatal stop (in all of these languages from an earlier palatal approximant *j) develops into an alveolar nasal  or a palatal nasal , when followed by another word-internal nasal consonant.

Phonology

Orthography 

Latin alphabet (1929—1939):

Cyrillic alphabet (1939 — present):

References

Further reading

External links

 Hakas People and Hakasia
 Khakasian Alphabet
 Khakas-Russian Online Dictionary
 Endangered languages project - Khakas
 OLAC resources in and about the Khakas language
 Spoken corpus of the dialects of Khakas
 Online Khakas corpus (in Russian)

Agglutinative languages
Siberian Turkic languages
Language
Turkic languages